Udham Singh (died June 8, 2013) was an Indian Maoist militant, member of the Naxalites, general secretary of the secretary of the Mohla Manpur area committee.

Death
On June 8, 2013, he was shot near Chhattisgarh, India.

References 

2013 deaths
Chhattisgarh politicians
Year of birth missing